Jason Roe (born 13 March 1984) is an indigenous and former Australian rules football player for the Brisbane Lions in the Australian Football League (AFL).

Originally playing for Nightcliff Football Club in the Northern Territory Football League (NTFL), then the Cairns City Cobras in the 2001–2002 seasons, Roe was selected in the 2002 rookie draft by the Collingwood Football Club and placed on its rookie list.  He was delisted at the end of 2003 having not played an AFL game, and moved to South Australian National Football League (SANFL) club North Adelaide.

He was given a second chance at AFL level and was placed on the Brisbane Lions rookie list in the 2006 rookie draft.

Roe was delisted by Brisbane following the 2009 season, after playing 50 AFL games.

Drug Scandal
In June 2015, Roe was released on bail after being charged of possession and supply of 750 grams (26.45 Ounces) of cannabis and was facing two charges of possession and supply of the drug. The value was deemed to be worth $75,000 AUD if it were sold in a remote community.

References

External links

Jason Roe at the Brisbane Lions website 

Brisbane Lions players
1984 births
North Adelaide Football Club players
Living people
Nightcliff Football Club players
Indigenous Australian players of Australian rules football
People from Darwin, Northern Territory
Australian rules footballers from the Northern Territory
Northern Territory Football Club players
East Perth Football Club players
Mooroopna Football Club players